The 2013 Northwestern State Demons football team represented Northwestern State University as a member of the Southland Conference during the 2013 NCAA Division I FCS football season. Led by first-year head coach Jay Thomas, the Demons compiled an overall record of 6–6 with a mark of 3–4 in conference play, placing fifth in the Southland. Northwestern State played home games at Harry Turpin Stadium in Natchitoches, Louisiana.

Schedule

Game summaries

Missouri State
Sources:

Southern

Sources:

Cincinnati

Sources:

UAB

Sources:

Langston

Sources:

Nicholls State

Sources:

Southeastern Louisiana

Sources:

Sam Houston State

Sources:

Central Arkansas

Sources:

Lamar

Sources:

McNeese State

Sources:

Stephen F. Austin

Sources:

Media
All games aired on the radio via the Demon Sports Network, found on KNWD and online at nsudemons.com.

References

Northwestern State
Northwestern State Demons football seasons
Northwestern State Demons football